Delisle is a town in south central Saskatchewan, Canada.

History 
The origins of the town go back to its original settlement on the Old Bone Trail. It derived its name from the DeLisle family. With the coming of the Canadian Northern Railway's line from Saskatoon to Calgary in 1908 the settlement to the south moved to the new townsite. The town was named after the brothers on December 29, 1908. Delisle was named a town in 1913.

Demographics 

Sights
A cenotaph stands in the heart of Delisle in front of the old hospital. On it are inscribed the names of those from Delisle and surrounding area who died in the two world wars. In 2002 the cenotaph was  refurbished and rededicated.

The town also boasts a nine-hole grass green golf course (Valleyview Golf Course).

Education
The town supports one of the largest high schools in the Prairie Spirit School Division bringing in students from smaller, nearby villages and hamlets such as Laura, Kinley, Donavon, Swanson, Vanscoy and the Pike Lake district, as well as rural students. It has a nine-man football team (Delisle Rebels) that has won several provincial titles; a track and field team that competes well for top spots in provincials and holds records for countless events; a soccer team that won provincials in 2009; and a drama program, that while in decline in recent years, has often performed well at large drama festivals. The school also contributes the most players for the Prairie Spirit (West) Band Program.

Notable people

 Doug Bentley, ice hockey winger and Hockey Hall of Fame member
 Max Bentley, ice hockey centre and Hockey Hall of Fame member
 Reg Bentley, ice hockey winger
 Bev Bentley, ice hockey goaltender
 Dick Butler, ice hockey winger
 Jack Miller, ice hockey winger
 Jack Norris, ice hockey goaltender

Media
Delisle was the setting for the Canadian modern day hockey movie Paperback Hero.

Delisle is considered part of the greater Saskatoon region and as such has direct access to most of its print, radio and television media.

References

Towns in Saskatchewan